Valerie Campos (born December 25, 1983 in Mexico City) is a Mexican artist.
She spent her early years in Los Angeles (California) with street art and lowbrow as some of her first visual influences. Self-taught, she began painting at the age of 22 and moved to Oaxaca (Mexico), internationally known as the city of the Mexican painters.

Resume 
In 2007 Valerie Campos presents her first solo exhibition at the Quetzalli Gallery in Oaxaca. In 2011 Campos holds two simultaneous exhibitions in Oaxaca of her work: "Where Dreams Come True" at the Museum of Oaxacan Painters and "Still Life" in Bodega Quetzalli Oaxaca. These exhibitions and a related monograph were supported by the Spanish curator Pablo J. Rico. Campos has gone on to exhibit her work in China, Indonesia, Canada, France, Spain and the United States.

In recent years, Campos has developed notable cross cultural projects in the arts. In 2014 she founds Nao Now with the intention of opening a new avenue for cultural exchange between Mexico and China. Through the support of Yuan Xu Centre, where she received a scholarship in 2013, she creates a residency for eight Mexican artists to produce work in Beijing for the summer of 2014.

Campos has shown her work in Beijing, China, "In The Centre Of The Labyrinth" at the Beijing Cultural Exhibition Centre,  "Lost Horizon" in Xu Yuan Centre for the group exhibition of Mexican artists within the project "Nao Now Mexico-Beijing 2014" in China, among other art centers such as “Dialogos con Goya", Alpilles-Provence in France (Festival- part) at the Lawrence Arts Center, Kansas, USA. "The fourth Elements" (itinerant) 2014, Red Gate Gallery, Beijing, China. “The Fourth Elements” 2013 Museum of Oaxacan Painters. "Amazing Stories- Interventions of a Floating World"in the Graphic Arts Institute of Oaxaca, 2013. "Fool's Gold" Intervention in-situ, MATRIA. "Where Dreams Come True" (itinerant), the Museum of Oaxacan Painters. "I Want to Believe" at the Banff Centre for the Arts (Canada). Her work was selected in the 4th Biennale of Yucatán (2009), Monterrey Artemergente 2010, 1st International Print Biennial J. Guadalupe Posada (2013) and Artfest 2006 . She was awarded by the National Fund for Culture and Arts of Mexico FONCA 2014-2015 (Young Creators Program) and 2021-2023 (National System of Art Creators); The Lawrence Arts Center of Kansas Residency for 2014-2015; The Xu Yuan Press Center of Beijing (China) Residency 2013-2014; Red Gate Gallery, Residency 2013; PECDA Oaxaca 2013. Banff Centre (Canada), Residency 2011.

She currently produces and directs AC Vaivén Collectors, a non-profit platform that produces short-format documentaries to disseminate, promote and open dialogues about contemporary art in Mexico. Valerie lives and works in Mexico City.

Publications 
 Where Dreams Come True
 Amazing Stories · The 4 Elements  with a run of 300 copies, each with the original charcoal drawings. Editorial Coordinator: Daniel Molina. Design and layout: Alfonso Morales. Photo: Daniel Molina. Curatorial text: Paul J. Rico. Texts: Valerie Fields.

References

Links
 
 https://www.vaivencollectors.com/valerie-campos-se
 https://www.vaivencollectors.com/inicio-eng

Press
 Beijing Today
 China Daily
 La Jornada

Living people
1983 births
21st-century Mexican women artists
Artists from Mexico City